Khumiso Stephen Ikgopoleng (born 5 December 1979) is a coach and former boxer from Botswana, who competed at the 2004 Summer Olympics in Athens, Greece. There he was eliminated in the second round of the men's featherweight (– 57 kg) division by Nigeria's Muideen Ganiyu.

Ikgopoleng carried the flag of Botswana at the opening ceremony of the Athens Games. He qualified by winning the gold medal at the 2nd AIBA African 2004 Olympic Qualifying Tournament in Gaborone, Botswana. In the final, he defeated South Africa's Ludumo Galada. He dropped down to the bantamweight division afterward and qualified at this weight class for the 2008 Olympics when he was placed 5th at the Beijing Olympics after losing in the quarter-finals. He competed in the 2008 Boxing World Cup in Russia and was placed 5th. He retired from professional boxing in February 2009. In 2012, he was the coach for the Botswana Olympic boxing team and was at the London Olympics that year. He continued as head coach of the Botswana senior boxing team until 2015 when he became a coach at The Corner Boxing Club in Boulder, Colorado, United States.

References

External links
 

1979 births
Living people
Featherweight boxers
Botswana male boxers
Boxers at the 2002 Commonwealth Games
Boxers at the 2004 Summer Olympics
Boxers at the 2008 Summer Olympics
Olympic boxers of Botswana
Commonwealth Games competitors for Botswana
African Games bronze medalists for Botswana
African Games medalists in boxing
Competitors at the 2007 All-Africa Games
People from Southern District (Botswana)